Neapolitan wafers (also called gaufrettes in some countries, though this term can refer to other foods) are  wafer and chocolate-cream sandwich biscuits, first made by the Austrian company Manner in 1898.

Using hazelnuts imported from the area of Naples, Italy, to make the hazelnut-flavoured chocolate cream filling, they have five wafers and four layers of cream in their  x  x  biscuit size. The basic recipe has remained unchanged into the 21st century.

Manner still sells the biscuits in blocks of ten. Many other companies have copied the idea, most often coating the bar in chocolate.

References

Austrian confectionery
Biscuit brands